Crime in the U.S. state of Alaska is exceptionally high and is present in various forms. Crime rates in Alaska are among the highest in the U.S.

Statistics
In 1985, a Chicago Tribune article reported Alaska had the United States' third highest per capita murder rate.

In 2008, there were 24,576 crimes reported in Alaska, including 27 murders, 20,097 property crimes, and 445 rapes.

In 2014, there were 25,018 crimes reported in Alaska, including 41 murders, 20,334 property crimes, and 555 rapes.

In 2019, there were 27,811 crimes reported in Alaska, including 70 murders, 21,469 property crimes, and 1,101 rapes.

Capital punishment laws
Capital punishment is not applied in Alaska, having been abolished by the territorial legislature prior to statehood.

Notable crimes
A notable pre-statehood criminal is Soapy Smith, who died in 1898 in the shootout on Juneau Wharf.

Between 1971 and 1983, Robert Hansen abducted, raped and murdered at least 17 and possibly 30+ women (more suspected), in and around Anchorage, Alaska.

In 1983, Louis D. Hastings killed 6 people and wounded 2 more in McCarthy, Alaska in an attempt to disrupt the Trans-Alaska Pipeline System.

In 1984, Michael Silka killed up to nine people in and around Fairbanks and Manley Hot Springs.

In 2016, James Dale Ritchie killed at least five people and wounded one police officer in Anchorage, Alaska.

See also 

 List of Alaska state prisons

References